Patriarch Theophilus or Theophilos may refer to:

 Theophilus of Antioch, ruled in 169–182
 Theophilus I of Alexandria, ruled in 385–412
 Theophilus II (Coptic patriarch of Alexandria), reigned 952–956
 Theophilus II (Greek patriarch of Alexandria), reigned 1010–1020
 Theophilus III of Alexandria, Greek patriarch 1805–1825
 Theophilus I of Jerusalem, ruled in 1012–1020)
 Theophilus II of Jerusalem, Greek Orthodox Patriarch of Jerusalem, ruled 1417–1424
 Abuna Theophilos, second Patriarch of the Ethiopian Orthodox Tewahido Church, ruled in 1971–1976
 Patriarch Theophilos III of Jerusalem, ruled since 2005